Parfino is the name of several inhabited localities in Parfinsky District of Novgorod Oblast, Russia.

Urban localities
Parfino, a work settlement under the administrative jurisdiction of Parfinskoye Settlement

Rural localities
Parfino (railway station), a rural locality classified as a railway station in Fedorkovskoye Settlement
Parfino (village), a village in Fedorkovskoye Settlement